The 2017–18 CWHL season is the 11th season of the Canadian Women's Hockey League. This is also the first season in which the teams pay their players a salary. It would also prove to be the final full season in which Brenda Andress served as commissioner of the league, tendering her resignation on July 18, 2019.

Offseason
On June 5, 2017, the league revealed at the Hockey Hall of Fame that it would expand into China with the Kunlun Red Star WIH, a women's team associated with the Kontinental Hockey League's Kunlun Red Star men's team. The recent expansions into China is aimed for developing their ice hockey teams for when Beijing hosts the 2022 Winter Olympics. Prior to the official announcement of the team joining the CWHL, Noora Räty and American forward Kelli Stack were at the announcement at the Hockey Hall of Fame wearing Red Star jerseys. The league soon added a second Chinese team in the Vanke Rays.

On July 11, 2017, it was announced that the Brampton Thunder, a founding franchise of the CWHL and the league's first champions, would be moving east to the Markham community of Thornhill, Ontatio. The move was announced with a press conference at their new arena with commissioner Brenda Andress, Mayor Frank Scarpitti, CWHL Director and esteemed Thunder alumni Vicky Sunohara, interim General Manager Chelsea Purcell (later named GM in August), and many Thunder players present.

On September 1, the league announced that it would begin having salaries for their players for the first time. Each player is set to make a minimum of $2,000 per season and a maximum of $10,000 with a team salary cap of $100,000. At the time of the announcement, it made the league the second fully professional women's hockey league in North America after the launch of the rival National Women's Hockey League in the United States in 2015.

Head coaching and front office personnel changes

Head coaches

Front office

CWHL Draft

The 2017 CWHL Draft marked the first time that the Draft involved the Kunlun Red Star WIH and Vanke Rays. Courtney Turner was selected with the first overall pick in the draft, claimed by the Boston Blades, becoming the first American-born player to be selected with the top pick.

News and notes
December 13, 2017: Erin Ambrose was traded from the Toronto Furies to les Canadiennes de Montreal. Ambrose did not play any games with the Furies this season as she had been centralized with the Canadian National Women's Team. In return, Toronto received Montreal's 2018 first and third round picks, a 2019 first round pick, and a 2020 third round pick.
January 10, 2018: Megan Bozek signed as a free agent with the Markham Thunder.
January 15, 2018: Alexandra Carpenter joined the Kunlun Red Star. KRS drafted her, but she had not played up until this date because she was centralized with the USNWT. 
March 8, 2018: Hilary Knight signed as a free agent with Les Canadiennes de Montreal, joining the team for the 2018 Clarkson Cup playoffs.
March 20, 2018: Prior to the 2018 Clarkson Cup finals, Cassie Campbell-Pascall resigned from her role as a CWHL Governor.

Regular season

Standings

Clarkson Cup playoffs
Laura Stacey would score against Noora Raty of the Kunlun Red Star with 2:11 left in the 4-on-4 overtime, as Markham prevailed by a 2–1 score for its first Clarkson Cup win.

Awards and honors

Regular season
Chairman's Trophy: Les Canadiennes de Montreal

Postseason awards
2018 Clarkson Cup Playoff MVP: Erica Howe
First Star of the Game: Laura Stacey
Second Star of the Game: Nicole Brown
Third Star of the Game: Kelli Stack

CWHL Awards

References

External links
 

 
Canadian Women's Hockey League seasons

1